The  was a Japanese AC electric multiple unit (EMU) train type first introduced by Japanese National Railways (JNR) in March 1985 and later operated on local services by the East Japan Railway Company (JR East) and Kyushu Railway Company (JR Kyushu). The units were formed by converting former AC/DC dual-voltage 451 series, 453 series, 457 series, and 475 series EMUs.

Variants
 717-0 series: 3-car 20 kV AC 50 Hz sets converted from former 451 series cars for use in the Sendai area
 717-100 series: 3-car 20 kV AC 50 Hz sets converted from former 451 and 453 series cars for use in the Sendai area
 717-200 series: 7 x 2-car 20 kV AC 60 Hz sets converted from November 1986 from former 475 series cars for use in Kyushu
 717-900 series: One 2-car 20 kV AC 60 Hz set converted from former 457 series cars for use in Kyushu

717-0 series

Five 3-car 20 kV AC 50 Hz sets were converted from former 451 series cars with new bodies for use in the Sendai area on Tohoku Main Line and Joban Line local services.

These sets were painted cream ("Cream No. 10") with a green bodyside stripe.

The last remaining set was withdrawn in August 2008.

Formations
The five 3-car sets, numbered T1 to T5, were formed as follows.

The MoHa 716 car was fitted with one lozenge-type pantograph.

Interior
These sets were made entirely no-smoking from 22 March 1997.

Withdrawal dates

717-100 series
Five 3-car 20 kV AC 50 Hz sets converted from former 451 and 453 series cars with new bodies for use in the Sendai area on Tohoku Main Line and Joban Line local services.

These sets were painted cream ("Cream No. 10") with a green bodyside stripe.

Formations
The five 3-car sets, numbered T101 to T105, were formed as follows.

The MoHa 716 car was fitted with one lozenge-type pantograph.

These sets were made entirely no-smoking from 22 March 1997.

Withdrawal dates

717-200 series

7 x 2-car 20 kV AC 60 Hz sets were converted from former 475 series cars with new bodies from November 1986 at JNR's Kokura and Kagoshima factories for use in Kyushu. The body design of these sets was identical to the earlier 713 series, with two pairs of sliding doors on each side. Four sets (HK201 to HK204) were converted in fiscal 1986, and three more sets (HK205 to HK207) were converted in fiscal 1987. The latter batch differed in having no door pocket windows.

These sets were painted white with a blue bodyside stripe.

, only sets HK203 and HK204 are in service, used on early morning and late night services only in the Kagoshima area, with all other sets withdrawn or stored pending withdrawal. Both sets were later withdrawn in 2014 with the increasing number of 817 series cars on the railway.

Formations
The 2-car sets, numbered HK201 to HK207, are formed as follows.

The KuMoHa 716-200 car is fitted with one lozenge-type pantograph.

717-900 series

One 2-car 20 kV AC 60 Hz set was converted from former 457 series cars in March 1995 for use in Kyushu, based at Kagoshima Depot. The conversion work involved adding another pair of sliding doors in the centre of each side.

Internally, some of the original transverse seating bays were replaced with longitudinal bench seating.

The sole 717-900 series set was withdrawn in December 2010.

Formation
The single 2-car set, HK901, was formed as follows.

KuMoHa 717-901 was converted from KuMoHa 457-14, and KuMoHa 716-901 was converted from former intermediate car MoHa 456-14 with the cab end from 455 series KuHa 455-601.

Interior

Withdrawal
The last two sets were withdrawn in July 2014. No 717 series cars have been preserved.

References

External links

   

Electric multiple units of Japan
Kyushu Railway Company
East Japan Railway Company
Train-related introductions in 1985
ja:国鉄413系・717系電車#717系
20 kV AC multiple units